Charles Murphy  (December 8, 1862 – November 24, 1935) was a Canadian politician.

Early life 
He was born on 8 December 1862 in Ottawa, the son of James Murphy, who came to Ontario from Ireland, and Mary Conway. Murphy studied at Ottawa University and Osgoode Hall, was called to the Ontario bar in 1891 and practised law in Ottawa.

Politics 
Murphy was elected as a Liberal MP for Russell (Ontario) in the House of Commons of Canada from 1908 to 1925.

He held several cabinet positions in the Laurier and King governments, including Secretary of State for External Affairs (1909–1911), Postmaster General (1921–1926) and acting Secretary of State of Canada (1925–1926).

He was later appointed to the Senate of Canada in 1925.

Later life and death  
He died in office in Ottawa in 1935, at the age of 72.

There is a Charles Murphy fonds at Library and Archives Canada.

References 

1862 births
1935 deaths
Lawyers in Ontario
Canadian senators from Ontario
Liberal Party of Canada MPs
Laurier Liberals
Liberal Party of Canada senators
Members of the House of Commons of Canada from Ontario
Members of the King's Privy Council for Canada
Politicians from Ottawa
Canadian people of Irish descent
Canadian Secretaries of State for External Affairs